Jericho, Pennsylvania may refer to:

Jericho, Cameron County, Pennsylvania, an unincorporated community
Jericho, Wayne County, Pennsylvania, an unincorporated community